Year 228 (CCXXVIII) was a leap year starting on Tuesday (link will display the full calendar) of the Julian calendar. At the time, it was known as the Year of the Consulship of Modestus and Maecius (or, less frequently, year 981 Ab urbe condita). The denomination 228 for this year has been used since the early medieval period, when the Anno Domini calendar era became the prevalent method in Europe for naming years.

Events 
 By place 

 Roman Empire 

 Domitius Ulpianus, a Roman jurist and prefect, is assassinated by the Praetorian Guard, in the presence of Emperor Severus Alexander. His curtailment of the privileges of the palace guard becomes Ulpianus' downfall, who in the course of a riot at Rome is murdered, between the soldiers and the mob.

 Persian Empire 
 King Ardashir I, four years after establishing the Sassanid Persian Empire, completes his conquest of Parthia.

 China 
 c. February–May – Battle of Jieting: The Cao Wei Kingdom decisively defeats the Shu Han Kingdom.
 June–October – Battle of Shiting: The Eastern Wu Kingdom defeats the Cao Wei Kingdom.

Births 
 Paul of Thebes, Christian hermit (approximate date)
 Wang Fan, Chinese politician and astronomer (d. 266)

Deaths 
 Cao Xiu, Chinese general of the Cao Wei state
 Domitius Ulpianus, Roman jurist and prefect (b. 170)
 Jia Kui, Chinese general of the Cao Wei state (b. 174)
 Lü Fan, Chinese general of the Eastern Wu state
 Luo Tong, Chinese official and general (b. 193)
 Ma Su, Chinese general of the Shu Han state (b. 190)
 Meng Da, Chinese general of the Cao Wei state
 Wang Lang, Chinese official of the Cao Wei state
 Zhuge Qiao, Chinese official and general (b. 204)

See also 

 2nd Battalion 28th Marines (often simply referred as 2/28).
 February 28 Incident (referred to in Chinese as "228").

References